Summer Sounds '66 is a Canadian music television series which aired on CBC Television in 1966.

Premise
Episodes were produced in various Canadian cities and featured musicians from the respective regions. One Halifax-produced episode featured Édith Butler, Anne Murray, Ken Tobias with host Bill Langstroth. Tommy Banks performed with Judi Singh on another episode from Edmonton.

Scheduling
This 15-minute series was broadcast on Saturdays at 6:30 p.m. (Eastern time) from 2 July to 15 October 1966.

References

External links
 

CBC Television original programming
1966 Canadian television series debuts
1966 Canadian television series endings